Sayula may refer to: 

Sayula, Jalisco, Mexico, birthplace of novelist Juan Rulfo
Sayula de Alemán, Veracruz, Mexico, birthplace of President Miguel Alemán Valdés
Sayula Popoluca, a language spoken in Sayula de Alemán
 Sayula II, a Swan 65 yacht designed by Sparkman & Stephens